Luís Germano "Luisinho" Borlotes Dias (born 14 April 1973) is a Mozambican former footballer who played as a goalkeeper. He played in 18 matches for the Mozambique national team from 1996 to 1999. He was also named in Mozambique's squad for the 1998 African Cup of Nations tournament.

References

External links
 

1973 births
Living people
Mozambican footballers
Association football goalkeepers
Mozambique international footballers
1996 African Cup of Nations players
1998 African Cup of Nations players
Place of birth missing (living people)